Dialling may refer to:

 Dialling (mathematics), the mathematics needed to determine solar time
 Dialling (telephony), making a telephone call